José Vélez (born 1951) is a Spanish singer.

José Vélez may also refer to:

José A. Vélez Jr. (born 1963), Puerto Rican jockey
Ñoño (born 1983), full name José Antonio Vélez Jiménez, Spanish footballer
José Vélez (politician) (born 1966), Spanish politician